The following is a list of all IFT-licensed over-the-air television stations broadcasting in the Mexican state of Baja California Sur. There are 22 television stations in Baja California Sur.

List of television stations

|-

|-

|-

|-

|-

|-

|-

|-

|-

|-

|-

|-

|-

|-

|-

|-

|-

|-

|-

|-

|-

|-

|-

|-

Defunct stations
 XHK-TV 10, La Paz (1968–2015)

Notes

References

Television stations in Baja California Sur
Baja California Sur